Cornerstone Christian School is a private Christian school located in Albion, Indiana.

See also
 List of high schools in Indiana

References

External links
 Official Website

Buildings and structures in Noble County, Indiana
Christian schools in Indiana